Deux Rivières (literally Two Rivers) is a commune in the department of Yonne, central France. The municipality was established on 1 January 2017 by merger of the former communes of Cravant (the seat) and Accolay.

See also 
Communes of the Yonne department

References 

Communes of Yonne